Mohamed Mahmoud Ould Mohamed Lemine (born 1952) is a Mauritanian politician.

Born at Hodh El Gharbi, Ould Mohamed Lemine graduated from the University of Cairo with a diploma in economics and has worked as a professor at the University of Nouakchott. He served as Minister of Defence under Prime Minister's Zeine Ould Zeidane and Yahya Ould Ahmed El Waghef until the August 2008 coup which overthrew President Sidi Ould Cheikh Abdallahi and created a new government with Moulaye Ould Mohamed Laghdaf as Prime Minister.

Lemine was the President of the Union for the Republic party from 2009 to 2019.

References 

Government ministers of Mauritania
1952 births
Living people
People from Hodh El Gharbi Region
Cairo University alumni
Union for the Republic (Mauritania) politicians